The FIA WTCC Race of Japan is a round of the World Touring Car Championship, which is held at Suzuka Circuit in Japan. It used to be held at the Okayama International Circuit and at Twin Ring Motegi. The race was first run in 2008, with Rickard Rydell and Tom Coronel winning.

Winners

Gallery

Japan
Japan
World Touring Car Championship